Bao Houchang (1911–1992), also known by the names Zhao Danian and Zhou Baisheng, was a Chinese politician. He was born in Wuxi, Jiangsu Province. During the Second Sino-Japanese War, he was a member of the New Fourth Army. He was CPPCC Committee Chairman of his home province.

1911 births
1992 deaths
People's Republic of China politicians from Jiangsu
Chinese Communist Party politicians from Jiangsu
Politicians from Wuxi
CPPCC Chairmen of Jiangsu